Calliopaea is a genus of  sea slugs, marine gastropod mollusks in the family Limapontiidae. These are sacoglossan sea slugs.

Species
Species within the genus Calliopaea include:
 Calliopaea bellula d'Orbigny, 1837
 Calliopaea oophaga Lemche in Gascoigne & Sartory, 1974
 Calliopaea rissoana Milne-Edwards, 1842
 Calliopaea souleyeti Vérany, 1846

References

 

Limapontiidae